Hinostroza is a surname. Notable people with the surname include:

Hernán Hinostroza (born 1993), Peruvian footballer
Janet Hinostroza, Ecuadorian journalist
John Hinostroza (born 1980), Peruvian footballer
Rodolfo Hinostroza (born 1941), Peruvian poet, writer, journalist, food critic and astrologer
Vinnie Hinostroza (born 1994), American professional ice hockey player